Papua New Guinea Olympic Committee (IOC code: PNG) is the National Olympic Committee representing Papua New Guinea.

See also
Papua New Guinea at the Olympics
Papua New Guinea at the Commonwealth Games

References 

Papua New Guinea